KXQZ (1340 AM, "Salt & Light") is a radio station licensed to serve the community of Wendell, Idaho. The station is owned by Salt & Light Radio, Inc., and airs a Catholic radio format.

The station was assigned the call sign KXSL by the Federal Communications Commission on December 10, 2010. The station changed its call sign to KTFI on February 3, 2011, and to KXQZ on January 27, 2015.

References

External links
 Official Website
 FCC Public Inspection File for KXQZ
 

Radio stations established in 2011
2011 establishments in Idaho
XQZ
Catholic radio stations
Gooding County, Idaho